Ignition is the first full-length album released by B1A4 under WM Entertainment. The album was released on March 14, 2012, by WM Entertainment and their distributing label Pony Canyon Korea. The album spawned two singles: "This Time Is Over" and "Baby I'm Sorry" which is the title track written and composed by the group's leader Jinyoung. A special edition of the album was released on May 24, 2012.

Starting off with the release of their single "This Time Is Over", the group formally started promotions for their first studio album a day after.

Background

After a successful entry into the Japanese market, the group finally started preparation for their upcoming comeback in Korea. Initially, rumors about the group releasing their 3rd mini album circulated around the internet to which the management immediately dismissed all rumors and added that the group's comeback is yet to be decided Production of the full album was done less than 2 months under the production of the newly rising composing group "Our Hyung and My Dongsaeng " (kor: 우리형과 내동생; rom: uri hyung-gwa nae dongsaeng)led the production of the album with the members actively participating in composing and writing lyrics for the songs, the first studio album of B1A4 was then released on March 14, 2012.

Release and promotion

Ahead of the release of their full album, WM Entertainment posted a notice on the group's official site that B1A4 would be releasing a song form their album entitled "This Time is Over" on March 5. The single was then leaked the morning of March 4 but the official release still pushed through and along with the release of the song, the first teaser photo featuring member BARO plus a teaser video was released. After the release of the first teaser photo, member Gongchan's photo was released the next then Jinyoung, CNU, and Sandeul in the span of 9 days with a 2-day interval each photo.

Promotions for the album officially began when the group had its first comeback stage at Mnet M! Countdown on March 14. The group performed a total of 2 songs, namely their title track "Baby I'm Sorry" and their other single "This Time Is Over". Comeback stages for KBS Music Bank, MBC Show! Music Core, SBS Inkigayo followed after.

Track listing

Charts

Weekly charts

Monthly charts

Single chart

Other songs charted

References 

2012 debut albums
B1A4 albums
Korean-language albums
Pony Canyon albums